Shadwell is a census-designated place (CDP) in Albemarle County, Virginia. It is located by the Rivanna River near Charlottesville. The site today is marked by a Virginia Historical Marker to mark the birthplace of President Thomas Jefferson. It is listed on the National Register of Historic Places along with Clifton.

Before early colonists moved into the Shadwell area, Monacan people had trails that traversed what became Shadwell. Peter Jefferson, the father of President Thomas Jefferson established and named the Shadwell plantation in the mid-18th century. Four generations of the Jefferson family lived at Shadwell. Initially, it was a plantation worked by enslaved and free people and grew tobacco, grain, and clover. Then, a grist mill, sawmill, and carding factory expanded the Shadwell economy. Canals and locks were constructed in the Rivanna River to transport goods, including lumber, flour, grain, and cotton-yard. After the carding factory burned down in the 1850s and the Louisa Railroad was completed, Shadwell began to decline economically. After that, the Shadwell estate became a farm, operated by Downing Smith. In 1991, an archaeological study found remnants of foundations and cellars of two houses, one of which is believed to be the original Jefferson house.

Located within the Shadwell, Virginia area are the Clifton and Edge Hill historic homes.

History

Early years
Monacan Native American people had trails that crossed through what is now Shadwell. There were three or four early colonial Virginia people who owned Shadwell before it was purchased by Peter Jefferson, the father of Thomas Jefferson. Shadwell began as a crossroads settlement, located at the intersection of Three Notch'd and Old Mountain Roads, which may also be called Turkey Sag.

The Jeffersons

It was named for the Shadwell parish in London by Peter Jefferson, a colonist and planter in central Virginia. Shadwell is the parish in England where his wife Jane Randolph had been christened. Peter Jefferson purchased 1,200 acres in 1736 and had 1,400 acres for his main plantation through a May 16, 1741 purchase. Peter married his wife in 1739 and completed the one-and-a-half-story house at Shadwell by about 1741.  Shadwell was the birthplace of Thomas Jefferson. Peter Jefferson built a gristmill on the Rivanna River about 1757. Native American leaders, including Ontasseté often stopped at Shadwell to visit with Peter Jefferson on their way to Colonial Williamsburg.

When his father died, Thomas inherited the property on April 13, 1764. Until 1776, the year of his mother's death, he leased the property from Jane Randolph Jefferson because she had a life estate for the property. Between 1765 and 1794, Thomas operated Shadwell as a tobacco plantation, led by overseer who was chosen to conduct work humanely and work performed in 1774 by six slaves. At that time, he had 18 slaves, but 12 of them were too old or too young to work. He also hired free men to work on the plantation. The estate included houses for slaves, tobacco barns, stables, mills, and gardens.

In 1770, the Jeffersons' house at Shadwell was destroyed in a fire, Jane had a smaller house built as a replacement. Thomas lived at Shadwell until the fire, at which time he removed to Monticello. During the fire, Thomas lost almost all of his books and all of his papers. Although Thomas did not live at Shadwell after the fire, he continued to operate Shadwell as a farm, growing rotating crops of clover, corn, and wheat. In 1771, Virginia's "greatest flood" to that time, destroyed the gristmill. Thomas Jefferson returned to public service and leased the plantation and a large manufacturing mill he built until 1813, when he deeded the property to Thomas Jefferson Randolph, his grandson. The current main house, located about two miles from the original house, was built about 1849 by Caryanne Randolph Ruffin and Colonel Frank Ruffin, Jefferson's granddaughter and Thomas Jefferson Randolph's daughter and her husband. They called it Shadwell and raised a large family there.

Manufacturing town

Shadwell became a manufacturing town, with timber, tobacco, cotton-yard and flour being transported on the Rivanna River. A dam, mill, and half-mile mill race were built on the Rivanna River by Peter Jefferson about 1757. Canals and locks were used at Shadwell for transportation of goods on the Rivanna River from 1789 until the 1860s. Jefferson operated a grist mill, saw mill, and carding factory until 1826 (year of his death). By 1835, Shadwell  was home to a large carding factory employing 100 workers, a large merchant mill, and a sawmill. It also had several general stores at Shadwell, shops, and private dwellings. The town prospered until 1850, when the factory burned and was shut down permanently. The town was a minor railroad center, but Shadwell also began to decline after Louisa Railroad, which paralleled Three Notch'd Road, came to the area in the 1840s.

Late 19th century and 20th century
Shadwell became focused once again on farming when Downing Smith of Greene County purchased 230 acres of Shadwell land in 1879. The following year he built a house near the site of the original Jefferson house. He came to own a total of 1035 acres of land from Shadwell and the Edge Hill plantation of the Randolph family of Virginia. After World War I, Shadwell grew as people began taking vacations by traveling by automobile. The railroad depot at Shadwell was closed in 1932.

In 1991, an archaeological study began at the site of the Jefferson's Shadwell plantation. Two cellar foundations were found, one of which is believed to be that of the first Jefferson house.

See also 
 Thomas Jefferson Center for Historic Plants

Notes

References

Further reading 
 
  architectural history study for Prof. William Kelso, University of Virginia

External links

Jefferson family residences
Houses in Albemarle County, Virginia
Presidential homes in the United States
Burned buildings and structures in the United States